Gaius Cornelius Cethegus was a consul of the Roman Republic in 197 BC. 

He became proconsul in Hispania in 200 BC  and was elected aedile in absentia. In Hispania he defeated a hostile force in the territory of the Sedetani and 15,000 of the enemy died. As an aedile he arranged magnificent plays. During his consulate in 197 BC he fought successfully in Gallia Cisalpina against the Insubrians and Cenomani and was awarded a triumph by the senate. He was censor in 194 BC. Along with Scipio Africanus and Marcus Minucius Rufus in 193 BC, he went as a commissioner to mediate an end to the war between Masinissa and Carthage.

See also
 Cornelia gens

References

2nd-century BC Roman consuls
Gaius
Roman censors
Roman patricians
2nd-century BC diplomats